Albibacillus is a gram-negative, rod-shaped and motile bacterial genus from the family Rhodobacteraceae with one known species (Albibacillus kandeliae). Ruegeria kandeliae has been reclassified to Albibacillus kandeliae.

References

Rhodobacteraceae
Bacteria genera
Taxa described in 2020
Monotypic bacteria genera